Art Strahan (born July 17, 1943) is a former American football player who played defensive end/defensive tackle for the Houston Oilers, Atlanta Falcons, Orlando Panthers, and Alabama Hawks.

Early life
Arthur Ray Strahan was born on July 17, 1943 in Newton, Texas. Strahan grew up in Houston, Texas.

Strahan attended Booker T. Washington High School in Newton. He was the co-captain of his high school football team.

College career
Strahan played as a defensive end and offensive lineman for four years at the Texas Southern University. He made all-conference teams his last two seasons.

Professional career
Strahan played with the Houston Oilers of the American Football League in 1965. He then played for the Orlando Panthers of the Continental Football League in 1966 and 1967, their first two seasons in Orlando.

The Panthers then sold Strahan's contract to the Dallas Cowboys on March 13, 1968. Strahan was cut by the Cowboys and picked up off the waiver wire by the Atlanta Falcons on August 28, 1968. The Falcons released Strahan on September 3, 1968 and sent him to play for the Continental Football League's Alabama Hawks. On November 16, 1968, Strahan was added back to the active roster of the Falcons.

Strahan was cut by the Falcons in September 1969, and returned to the Orlando Panthers for the 1969 season.

Strahan was signed by the Los Angeles Rams on May 16, 1970. He was subsequently released on September 4, 1970. He played 2 games with the Toronto Argonauts of the CFL in 1970.

Personal life
Strahan married Delores Jean and together they had two sons, Andre and Derrick.

He is the uncle of Michael Strahan. Michael Strahan would follow his uncle in attending the Texas Southern University and becoming a defensive end in the NFL.

References

External links

1943 births
Living people
People from Newton, Texas
Texas Southern Tigers football players
American football defensive ends
Houston Oilers players
Dallas Cowboys players
Los Angeles Rams players
Atlanta Falcons players
Players of American football from Houston
American Football League players
Continental Football League players
African-American players of American football